Jimmy Scott was the second man on the Airth Bruce Castle Dunsmore CC (from Falkirk, Scotland) during the inaugural Curling World Championships known as the 1959 Scotch Cup, where Scottish team won silver medals. The team won The Rink Championship in 1950, 1953, 1954, 1955 and 1958.

References 

Year of birth missing (living people)
Living people
Place of birth missing (living people)
Scottish male curlers